The Constitutional Court of Mongolia is the highest court in Mongolia responsible for the interpretation of the constitution. Thus, the Constitutional Court has supreme power over the implementation of the Mongolian Constitution. The Court delivers decisions on violations of constitutional procedures and resolves constitutional disputes. All governmental action is subject to the Court.

The Constitutional Tsets consists of nine members. A member of the Tsets must be a citizen of Mongolia who has high legal and political professional standing, is without a criminal record against and has reached 40 years of age. In accordance with the law, the members of the Constitutional Court are appointed by the State Great Hural for a term of six years, with three of them to be nominated by the State Great Hural, three by the President of Mongolia and three by the Supreme Court of Mongolia.

Questions regarding laws other than the Constitution are the province of the Supreme Court of Mongolia.

Organization 

The term of office of the newly appointed or filled in vacancy, member of the Tsets commences on the day of appointment and continues until the expiration of their term of office as provided for in the Constitution.
The Chairman of the Constitutional Court co-ordinates its activities. Nine members of the Tsets propose from among themselves the name of a person who is to be elected Chairperson and elect the person who receives the majority of votes as the Chairperson. The Chairperson of the Tsets is elected for a term of three years and may be re-elected only once.
The State Great Hural determines and adopts the funds for the budget of the Tsets, the salary fund for the Tsets, and the salaries of members of Tsets upon the proposal of the Chairperson.

Symbol 

The Constitutional Court has its own emblem and its members wear judicial robes in line with international standards and Mongolian statehood traditions.

“The symbol of the Constitutional Court of Mongolia” is round-shaped and carries the words “Constitutional Court of Mongolia” in Cyrillic around the edge with male and female fish on the top, and the combination of scale with black and white cups and stretched bow and arrow in the center. The male and female fish on the top expresses the idea that the Constitutional Court shall safeguard vigilantly the nation’s Constitution without blinking the eyes and shall act while balancing the scales of truth. The balancing scale with black and white cups symbolizes that the Constitutional Court shall consider any constitutional disputes basing on strict observance of the law, and using the best of intellectual brain and issue honest and accurate decision. The stretched bow and arrow symbolized that the Constitutional Court decision shall be precise, sharp and fair. The words “Constitutional Court of Mongolia”, male and female fish image and the frame around shall be in golden color symbolizing the ever shining sun, while the scale, the stretched bow and arrow shall be placed on blue round-shaped background representing the eternal blue sky.

See also
Constitution
Constitutionalism
Constitutional economics
Jurisprudence
Judiciary
Rule of law
Rule According to Higher Law

References

External links
 

Law of Mongolia
Government of Mongolia
Mongolia
Judiciary of Mongolia
1992 establishments in Mongolia
Courts and tribunals established in 1992